Tarek Alaa (born 1 January 2003) is an Egyptian professional footballer who plays as a midfielder for Egyptian Premier League club Zamalek.

References

Living people
Egyptian footballers
Egypt youth international footballers
Association football midfielders
Zamalek SC players
Egyptian Premier League players
2003 births